The seventh season of the animated television series My Little Pony: Friendship Is Magic, developed by Lauren Faust, originally aired on the Discovery Family channel in the United States. The series is based on Hasbro's My Little Pony line of toys and animated works and is often referred by collectors to be the fourth generation, or "G4", of the My Little Pony franchise. Season 7 of the series premiered on April 15, 2017 on Discovery Family, an American pay television channel partly owned by Hasbro, and concluded on October 28, twenty-two days after My Little Pony: The Movie was released in theaters.

Cast

Main 
 Tara Strong as Twilight Sparkle
 Rebecca Shoichet as Twilight Sparkle (singing voice)
 Tabitha St. Germain as Rarity
 Kazumi Evans as Rarity (singing voice)
 Ashleigh Ball as Applejack and Rainbow Dash
 Andrea Libman as Fluttershy and Pinkie Pie
 Shannon Chan-Kent as Pinkie Pie (singing voice)
 Cathy Weseluck as Spike

Recurring 
 Kelly Sheridan as Starlight Glimmer
 Nicole Oliver as Princess Celestia
 Tabitha St. Germain as Princess Luna
 The Cutie Mark Crusaders
 Michelle Creber as Apple Bloom
 Madeleine Peters as Scootaloo
 Claire Corlett as Sweetie Belle

Minor

Single role 

 John de Lancie as Discord
 Kathleen Barr as Trixie Lulamoon
 Kyle Rideout as Thorax
 Ian Hanlin as Sunburst
 Ali Milner as Princess Ember
 Andrew Francis as Shining Armor
 Britt McKillip as Princess Cadance
 Ingrid Nilson as Maud Pie
 Peter Kelamis as Big Daddy McColt
 Kelly Sheridan as Sassy Saddles
 Kelly Metzger as Spitfire
 Rebecca Shoichet as Sugar Belle
 Garry Chalk as Prince Rutherford
 Chiara Zanni as A.K. Yearling/Daring Do
 Brenda Crichlow as Zecora
 Richard Ian Cox as Mr. Breezy

Multiple roles 

 Michael Dobson as Bulk Biceps and Dr. Caballeron
 Graham Verchere as Chipcutter and Pipsqueak
 Vincent Tong as Garble, Feather Bangs, and Rumble
 Peter New as Big McIntosh and Goldie Delicious
 Tabitha St. Germain as Flurry Heart, Granny Smith, Pound Cake, Zipporwhill, Photo Finish, Pearly Stitch, and Mrs. Cake
 Nicole Oliver as Miss Cheerilee and Dr. Fauna
 Andrea Libman as Pumpkin Cake, Fleetfoot, Lily Lace, and Bon Bon
 Ashleigh Ball as Nurse Redheart, Lyra Heartstrings, and Daisy
 Kazumi Evans as Wrangler and Rose
 Trevor Devall as Hoity Toity, Thunderlane, and Iron Will
 Cathy Weseluck as Mayor Mare and Lily Valley
 Brian Drummond as Filthy Rich, Davenport, and Dr. Horse

Guest stars

Single role 

 Jason Simpson as Spearhead
 Russell Roberts as Rusty Tenure
 Mark Gibbon as Hard Hat
 Mackenzie Gray as Dandy Grandeur
 Jason Deline as Bow Hothoof
 Sarah Edmondson as Windy Whistles
 Michael Antonakos as Starstreak
 Caitriona Murphy as Inky Rose
 Maggie Blue O'Hara as Strawberry Sunrise
 Tony Alcantar as Mayor of Fillydelphia
 Scott Underwood as Mayor of Baltimare
 William Shatner as Grand Pear
 Felicia Day as Pear Butter
 Bill Mondy as Burnt Oak
 Alyssya Swales as Toola Roola
 Aine Sunderland as Coconut Cream
 Ellen-Ray Hennessy as Mistmane
 Elysia Rotaru as Sable Spirit
 Giles Panton as Flash Magnus
 Paul Dobson as Commander Ironhead
 Janyse Jaud as Mrs. Trotsworth
 Doron Bell as Cattail
 Mariee Devereux as Mage Meadowbrook
 Lili Beaudoin as Kettle Corn
 Patricia Drake as Twilight Velvet
 Charles Demers as Night Light
 Chris Britton as Star Swirl the Bearded
 Murry Peeters as Somnambula
 Matt Cowlrick as Rockhoof
 Kelli Ogmundson as Professor Fossil

Multiple roles 
 Bill Newton as Bright Mac, Pharynx, and the Pony of Shadows/Stygian
 Zach LeBlanc as Skeedaddle and Star Tracker

Episodes

Notes

Songs

DVD release

References 

2017 American television seasons
2017 Canadian television seasons
7
Limbo